The State Heraldic Museum in Kildare Street, Dublin, was founded in 1909 and was prior to its closure one of the first and oldest such museums in the world. It was housed in part of the building still occupied by the Office of the Chief Herald of Ireland, in the former Coffee Room of the Kildare Street Club.

Among its many exhibits were representations of corporate and civic arms and the heraldic banners of the Chiefs of the Name.

It also displayed arms of Ireland which once hung in the Houses of Parliament in College Green, a police notice on information on the theft of the Irish crown jewels in 1907, the funeral hatchment of Daniel O'Connell used on his hearse, the Irish Lord Chancellor's purse, and many other items of heraldic interest.

References

External links
 State Heraldic Museum

Museums established in 1909
Museums in Dublin (city)
Heraldic sites
Defunct museums
1909 establishments in Ireland
2011 disestablishments in Ireland
Museums disestablished in 2011